Uneapa (often called "Bali", natively ) is an Oceanic language spoken by about 10,000 people on the small island of Bali (Uneapa), north of West New Britain in Papua New Guinea. It is perhaps a dialect of neighboring Vitu. Uneapa is one of the most conservative Oceanic languages, having retained most of Proto-Oceanic's final consonants with an echo vowel, such as  'house' >  and  'bad' > .

A sketch grammar of this language was published in 2002 by Malcolm Ross.

Name
The name Uneapa is a variation of the native name  for the island. In Vitu, the same island is called .

The alternative name Bali, used by foreigners, comes from the term  meaning 'to be not'. It is not related etymologically to the more popular Indonesian island called Bali, which is home to a distantly related language called Balinese.

Classification
Uneapa, together with neighboring Vitu, forms a subgroup within the Meso-Melanesian cluster of the Oceanic languages. The two are sometimes considered to be a single language, called Bali-Vitu. However, there are some differences, particularly in their phonemic inventories, retention of final consonants (which is lost in Vitu), pronoun systems, and word choices. In general, Uneapa tends to be more conservative than Vitu in most respects.

Phonology
Phonemically, Uneapa has five vowels and fourteen consonants.

Uneapa has a simple phonotactic structure, either V, CV, VV, CVV. Stress is located at the penultimate syllable. Optionally, clitic-final vowels may be lost, such as underlying  'is not' becoming .

Example sentence
The following sentence illustrates the conservatism of Uneapa relative to Proto-Oceanic.

Uneapa:

Proto-Oceanic:

References

External links 
 Paradisec has a collection of Malcolm Ross's materials (MR1) that include Uneapa language materials.

Meso-Melanesian languages
Languages of West New Britain Province